Apura is a genus of moths belonging to the family Tortricidae.

Species
Apura xanthosoma  Turner, 1916
Apura xylodryas  Meyrick, 1927

References

 , 2005: World Catalogue of Insects volume 5 Tortricidae.
 , 1916, Trans. R. S. Austral. 40: 519.

External links
tortricidae.com

Polyorthini
Tortricidae genera
Taxa named by Alfred Jefferis Turner